The Eastern State Normal School is a former college located in Castine, Maine. It operated between 1867 and 1942. During its last year, it shared its buildings with the Maine Maritime Academy, which ended up taking over its space once the school closed

Notable people
 Frances Lewis Brackett Damon (1857–1939), graduated 1880; American poet, writer
 Effie Hinckley Ober, founder & manager of the Boston Ideal Opera Company
 George A. Phillips, medical doctor and Maine state legislator

References

External links
History of the Maine Maritime Academy and the Eastern State Normal School

Defunct universities and colleges in Maine
Education in Hancock County, Maine
Buildings and structures in Hancock County, Maine
Educational institutions established in 1867
Educational institutions disestablished in 1942
1867 establishments in Maine
1942 disestablishments in Maine
Castine, Maine